Yvon Taillandier (28 March 1926 in Paris – 3 March 2018 in Paris) was a French artist, author and critic.

Biography
Taillandier was Secretary of the Salon de Mai Committee for 44 years. Taillandier contributed for 14 years to the journal Connaissance des Arts (Acquaintance with the Arts) and contributed works to the Salon de Mai, Salon des Réalités Nouvelles, Salon de la Jeune Peinture, Salon Comparaisons, Salon Grands et Jeunes d'Aujourd'hui, Salon d'Art Sacré and Salon Figuration Critique.

Taillandier died in Paris on 3 March 2018 at the age of 91.

Selected publications
 1949. Essai sur Giotto. Editions Hypérion.
 1960.  Le voyage de l'œil, couverture illustrée par Lanskoy.  Editions Calmann-Lévy
 Flammarion. Collection Les Maîtres de la peinture moderne 
 1961. Cézanne
 1963. Monet
 1967. Corot
 1967. Rodin
 1964. En collaboration avec Camille Bryen, livre-objet intitulé Un spectacle initiatique 
 1969. L'abstrait. Une histoire globale de l'art et du monde. Collection Les métamorphoses de l'humanité. Editions Planète
 1970. Dessins de Wifredo Lam (Collection dirigée par Alex Grall) Denoël 
 1972. Miro à l'encre.  Editions XXè siècle
 1975. Texte dans l'ouvrage collectif San Lazarro et ses amis  publié en hommage à San Lazarro, après sa mort. Editions XXè siècle

References

External links
Official website.

1926 births
2018 deaths
Artists from Paris
Writers from Paris
French art critics
French art historians
French male non-fiction writers